The Federation of Public Housing Estates is a pro-Beijing organisation formed in 1985 by 11 community associations. It focuses on public housing policies and caters to the interests of the residents of the public housing estates.

Leadership

President
 Hau Shui-pui

Chairmen
 Lam Yuk-tong
 Hau Shui-pui
 Wong Kwan

Performance in elections

District Council elections

Representatives

District Councils
The FPHE has won three seats in two District Councils (2020–2023):

See also
 United Front Work Department
 United Front (China)

References

1985 establishments in Hong Kong
Political organisations based in Hong Kong
Conservative parties in Hong Kong